Harald Eiríksson  (fl. 1190s), also known as Harald the Young, was joint Earl of Orkney with Harald Maddadsson. He was the son of Orkney chief Eirik Stagbrell and Ingerid Ragnvaldsdotter, the daughter of Rögnvald Kali Kolsson, the former Earl of Orkney.

For a long time, sovereignty over Caithness was disputed between the King of Scotland and the Norwegian Earldom of Orkney.  As part of his struggle with Harald Maddadsson, King William I of Scotland (Uilleam I of Alba) granted lands in Caithness to Harald the Young. Harald was also confirmed as joint earl of Orkney with Harald Maddadsson by King William I. In about 1196, Harald Maddadsson agreed to pay a monetary tribute for Caithness to King William I. Harald the Young was subsequently killed by Harald Maddadsson.

Sources
Orkneyinga Saga: The History of the Earls of Orkney (tr. Hermann Pálsson and Paul Edwards. Penguin, London, 1978) 
  Viking Orkney: A Survey (Morris, Christopher. The Prehistory of Orkney. Ed. Colin Renfrew. Edinburgh: Edinburgh University Press. 1985)

Earls of Orkney
12th-century Norwegian nobility
12th-century mormaers
Mormaers of Caithness